George Trapp, Jr. (July 11, 1948 – January 21, 2002) was an American professional basketball player.

Amateur career 

A 6'8" forward/center from Monrovia, California by way of Detroit, Trapp played his senior year of high school basketball at Monrovia High School in 1966–67 where  Trapp contributed to the Wildcats first CIF basketball Championship. Trapp then went on to play college basketball, initially at Pasadena City College, leading the team to a state community college title, then transferring to Long Beach State, following PCC coach Jerry Tarkanian who had taken the head coaching position at LBSU.  Trapp won two Pacific Coast Athletic Association MVP Awards with Long Beach. In 1971, his senior year, Trapp led Long Beach State to the Elite Eight of the 1971 NCAA Division I men's basketball tournament, but the team lost 57-55 to UCLA, the eventual winner of the tournament.

Professional career 

After his college career ended, Trapp was selected by the Atlanta Hawks with the fifth pick of the 1971 NBA Draft. He played six seasons in the NBA with the Hawks (1971–1973) and Detroit Pistons (1973–77), and averaged 8.8 points per game over his career. He was known for his outside shooting and "electrifying drives to the hoop".

His best scoring season was his second year with Atlanta when he averaged 11.3 ppg and 5.9 rpg in 24.1 mpg as a top reserve in the 1972-73 Atlanta Hawks season.  He was traded to his hometown Detroit Pistons for a first-round draft choice that off-season.  With Detroit, he became a key reserve, helping the Pistons to the post-season in each of his 4 years with the team.  After his release by Detroit at the start of the 1976-77 season, he played for the Rochester in the Continental Basketball Association in the 1977-78 season, and then briefly for the U/Tex Wranglers in the Philippine Basketball Association in 1979.

Personal life 

His brother John Trapp was drafted with the 15th overall pick in the 1968 NBA draft.  Both Trapp brothers played at Pasadena City College (PCC) and are members of the PCC Athletics Hall of Fame, with George honored in 2013.  George is also a member of the Long Beach State Athletics Hall of Fame, inducted in 1991.

On January 9, 2002, Trapp was stabbed in the stomach during a fight with a roommate in Detroit. He died twelve days later.

See also
 List of homicides in Michigan

References

1948 births
2002 deaths
American expatriate basketball people in France
American men's basketball players
Atlanta Hawks draft picks
Atlanta Hawks players
Basketball players from Detroit
Centers (basketball)
Deaths by stabbing in the United States
Detroit Pistons players
Long Beach State Beach men's basketball players
Male murder victims
Monrovia High School alumni
Pasadena City Lancers men's basketball players
People murdered in Michigan
Power forwards (basketball)